The Earth BioGenome Project (EBP) is an initiative that aims to sequence and catalog the genomes of all of Earth's currently described eukaryotic species over a period of ten years. The initiative would produce an open DNA database of biological information that provides a platform for scientific research and supports environmental and conservation initiatives. A scientific paper presenting the vision for the project was published in PNAS in April 2018, and the project officially launched November 1, 2018.

History 
The initiative was inspired by Human Genome Project, and emerged during November 2015 meeting between Harris Lewin (UCD), Gene E. Robinson (IGB) and W. John Kress (Smithsonian Institution's National Museum of Natural History). In February 2017, at major conference on genomics and biodiversity organized by the Smithsonian Institution and BGI in Washington, D.C. was supported project's 10-year plan and organizational structure.

Summary 
The project is projected to cost US$4.7 billion. It includes already ongoing projects such as i5K (insects), B10K (birds), 10KP (plants), and the Darwin Tree of Life, which aim to sequence the estimated 66,000 eukaryotic species in the United Kingdom. The project is aiming to sequence and annotate the roughly 1.5 million known eukaryotic species in three phases, with first to create "annotated chromosome-scale reference assemblies for at least one representative species of each of the ~9,000 eukaryotic taxonomic families".

According to PNAS paper, several sequencing centers are supporting the project, including BGI (China), Baylor College of Medicine (USA), Wellcome Sanger Institute (UK), Rockefeller University (US), with an additional center to be established for the project in South America by São Paulo Research Foundation. As for bio-observatories which use genomics, examples which meet the project needs are National Ecological Observatory Network, Chinese Ecological Research Network, ForestGEO, and MarineGEO. To provide insight into the feasibility and technical requirements for "planetary scale" projects such as this, the 10,000 Plant Genome Project has published a pilot "Digitalization of Ruili Botanical Garden" project sampling and sequencing 761 vascular plant specimens growing in a Botanical Garden in South West China.

See also 
 Earth Microbiome Project
 1000 Plant Genomes Project
 100,000 Genomes Project
 Human Genome Project
 All Species Foundation
 Encyclopedia of Life
 Wellcome Sanger Institute

References

External links 
 Earth BioGenome Project Website
 The Insect 5,000 Genomes (i5k) Project Website
 The Bird 10,000 Genomes (B10K) Project Website
 The Darwin Tree of Life Website
 The European Reference Genome Atlas (ERGA) Website

Genome projects
Biobank organizations